The 1893 Richmond Colts football team was an American football team that represented Richmond College—now known as the University of Richmond—as an independent during the 1893 college football season. Dana Rucker returned for his second year as head coach, having helmed the team in 1891. Richmond compiled a record of 3–2.

Schedule

References

Richmond
Richmond Spiders football seasons
Richmond Spiders football